Igor Olegovich Ozhiganov (born 13 October 1992) is a Russian professional ice hockey defenceman currently playing for SKA Saint Petersburg in the Kontinental Hockey League (KHL). He has formerly played in the National Hockey League (NHL) with the Toronto Maple Leafs.

Playing career
Ozhiganov played junior hockey within the CSKA Moscow organization. During the 2010–11 season, he made his professional debut by featuring in two games with CSKA in the Kontinental Hockey League (KHL).

Having established himself in the KHL with CSKA, Amur Khabarovsk and Sibir Novosibirsk, Ozhiganov despite being undrafted, initially met with Mike Babcock and Lou Lamoriello of the Toronto Maple Leafs in August 2017. While long rumoured to sign with the Maple Leafs, Ozhiganov played out the 2017–18 season in the KHL with CSKA, scoring 9 points in 42 games.

On 17 May 2018, Ozhiganov signed a one-year, entry-level contract with the Maple Leafs. After attending the Maple Leafs training camp, Ozhiganov remained on the opening night roster for the 2018–19 season. On 26 November, he scored his first NHL goal, against the Boston Bruins in a 4–2 home win. Ozhiganov established himself as a regular on the blueline in the first half of the season before falling out of favour with head coach Mike Babcock, sitting as a healthy scratch for 12 of the final 19 contests, including all seven playoff games against the Boston Bruins. He finished the season with 7 points in 53 games.

On 1 May 2019, Ozhiganov's KHL rights were traded by CSKA to Ak Bars Kazan in exchange for Jiri Sekac. As an impending free agent, Ozhiganov's departure from the Maple Leafs was confirmed on 17 May 2019, after he signed a two-year contract to return to the KHL with Ak Bars. His move to Ak Bars reunited Ozhiganov with head coach Dmitri Kvartalnov, formerly of CSKA.

In the 2019–20 season, Ozhiganov made 19 appearances with Ak Bars, posting 8 points before he was traded to SKA Saint Petersburg in exchange for Roman Rukavishnikov and Viktor Tikhonov on 7 November 2019.

Personal life
Ozhiganov is married to rhythmic gymnast Alexandra Merkulova, and they have one son together.

Career statistics

Regular season and playoffs

International

Awards and honours

References

External links
 

1992 births
Living people
Ak Bars Kazan players
Amur Khabarovsk players
HC CSKA Moscow players
Krasnaya Armiya (MHL) players
People from Krasnogorsk, Moscow Oblast
Russian ice hockey defencemen
HC Sibir Novosibirsk players
SKA Saint Petersburg players
Toronto Maple Leafs players
Undrafted National Hockey League players
Sportspeople from Moscow Oblast